L'Engle is a crater on Mercury, located near the south pole.  Its name was adopted by the International Astronomical Union (IAU) in 2013, after American author Madeleine L'Engle.

L'Engle has a crater floor that is in permanent shadow.  So do nearby craters Chao Meng-Fu (at the south pole), Lovecraft, and Hurley.

References

Impact craters on Mercury